Eunoe subfumida is a scale worm described from the Philippines.

Description
Number of segments 37; elytra 15 pairs. Dorsum brown with two white longitudinal lines. Notochaetae distinctly thicker than neurochaetae. Bidentate neurochaetae absent.

References

Phyllodocida